The Atlanta Classic was a golf tournament on the PGA Tour, a regular stop in suburban Atlanta for over four decades. It was founded in 1967, although previous events dating to 1934 are included in the PGA Tour's past winners list. AT&T was the last title sponsor of the tournament.

From 1967 to 1996, it was played at the Atlanta Country Club in Marietta, northwest of Atlanta. From 1997 to 2008, it was played over the Stables and Meadows nines at TPC at Sugarloaf in Duluth, northeast of Atlanta.

For most of its years, the Atlanta tournament was usually held in May.  From 1999–2006, it was moved to early April, the week before the Masters. Its final two editions were in mid-May, a week after the Players Championship (which was moved from late March). The tournament was cancelled after the 2008 season.

This event is not to be confused with the AT&T Champions Classic played in Valencia, California, a Champions Tour (now PGA Tour Champions) tournament which bore the "AT&T Classic" name in 2006, prior to AT&T's acquisition of BellSouth. It was cancelled after the 2009 season. 

TPC Sugarloaf currently hosts an annual PGA Tour Champions event, the Mitsubishi Electric Classic, which debuted in 2013.

Tournament highlights
1967: Bob Charles wins the first modern era PGA Tour event played in Atlanta. He finishes two shots ahead of Gardner Dickinson, Tommy Bolt, and Richard Crawford.
1968; Bob Lunn is victorious for the second straight week on the PGA Tour. He wins by three shots over Lee Trevino. 
1970: Georgia native Tommy Aaron wins by one shot over Dan Sikes. Tom Weiskopf came to the 72nd hole tied with Aaron but closed with a double bogey.
1972: Bob Lunn becomes the tournament's first repeat winner. He beats Gary Player by two shots. 
1977: Hale Irwin becomes the first Atlanta champion to successfully defend his title. He beats Steve Veriato by two shots. 
1979: Andy Bean shoots a third round 61 on his way to an 8-stroke victory over Joe Inman.
1980: Georgian Larry Nelson wins by seven shots over Don Pooley and defending champion Andy Bean.
1983: Calvin Peete shoots a final round 63, including a hole out for birdie from a bunker on the 71st hole. He wins by two shots over Chip Beck, Jim Colbert, and Don Pooley.
1986: Bob Tway shoots a final round 64 to win by two shots over Hal Sutton.
1988 Larry Nelson birdies the 72nd hole to become a two-time winner of the tournament. He edges Chip Beck by one shot.
1990: Wayne Levi birdies the 72nd hole in near darkness to earn his first PGA Tour win in five years. He finishes one shot ahead of Nick Price, Keith Clearwater, and Larry Mize.  
1992: Tom Kite begins the final round bogey-bogey before making six consecutive birdies on his way to a three shot victory over Jay Don Blake. Amateur David Duval, a junior at Georgia Tech held the 54 hole lead by two strokes before shooting a final round 79 to finish T13. 
1994: John Daly wins by one shot over Brian Henninger and defending champion Nolan Henke. Afterwards Daly says "This is the first tournament I've won on the PGA Tour in a sober fashion."
1996: Sixth alternate Paul Stankowski birdies the first sudden death playoff hole to defeat Brandel Chamblee.    
1998: Tiger Woods notches his only victory of the year in Atlanta. He finishes one shot ahead of Jay Don Blake.
2000: Phil Mickelson wins for the first time in Atlanta. He birdies the first hole of a sudden death playoff to defeat Gary Nicklaus. 
2003: Ben Crane shoots a final round 63 to win by four shots over Bob Tway. 
2006: Mickelson dominates the field, using two drivers in preparation for the Masters the following week.  He concluded with an eagle on the 72nd hole to post a score of 28-under-par, a career best.  Mickelson won by 13 strokes over José María Olazábal and Zach Johnson, and would go on to win the Masters the next week.
2007: Zach Johnson seems to like playing golf in Georgia. His third career PGA Tour victory like his first two, the 2004 BellSouth Classic and the 2007 Masters Tournament take place in the state. He defeats Ryuji Imada on the first hole of a sudden death playoff. 
2008: The last version of the tournament sees Ryuji Imada win in a sudden death playoff over Kenny Perry.

Winners

References

External links
Official website
PGATOUR.com Tournament website

Former PGA Tour events
Golf in Georgia (U.S. state)
Sports competitions in Atlanta